Lalibela may refer to:
 Lalibela, Emperor of Ethiopia in the 12th century 
 Lalibela, a place in Amhara Region, Ethiopia
 "Lalibela", a song by Canadian electronic musician Caribou (musician)
 Lalibela (yacht), luxury yacht, destroyed by fire, 2018-10-13